Hertzogville is a small cattle and sheep farming town in the Free State province of South Africa. It is named after South Africa's longest-serving prime minister, James Barry Munnik Hertzog.

Hertzogville lies about an hour and a half from three main cities, Bloemfontein, Kimberley and Welkom.  The town was established in 1915 on the Donkerfontein Farm, and acquired municipal status in 1924. Hertzogville is a small farming community that mainly speaks Afrikaans. Other languages that are spoken are Tswana/Sotho and some Xhosa. The town lies in the heart of the "bread basket" of the country, and very near to the centre of South Africa. Farming is the main industry and accounts for most of the income of the district. Maize, wheat and groundnuts are the principal crops. Sheep and cattle farming are also important.

An agricultural show is staged annually in March/April with many farm animals and farming equipment on display. There are also many local recreational activities like quad biking, horse riding, hunting, games for children and a dance on one evening, usually with popular singers of South Africa.

References

Populated places in the Tokologo Local Municipality
Populated places established in 1915